The Jewish Colonisation Association (JCA or ICA, Yiddish ייִק"אַ), in America spelled Jewish Colonization Association, is an organisation created on September 11, 1891, by Baron Maurice de Hirsch. Its aim was to facilitate the mass emigration of Jews from Russia and other Eastern European countries, by settling them in agricultural colonies on lands purchased by the committee  in North America (Canada and the United States), South America (Argentina and Brazil) and Ottoman Palestine. Today ICA is still active in Israel in supporting specific development projects under the name Jewish Charitable Association (ICA).

History

Palestine and Israel

In 1896 the JCA started offering support to Jewish farming communities newly established in Ottoman Palestine. In 1899 Baron Edmond James de Rothschild transferred title to his settlements ("moshavot") in Palestine along with fifteen million francs to the JCA. Starting on January 1, 1900 the JCA restructured the way in which the colonies received financial and managerial support, with the effect of making them more profitable and independent. Between 1900 and 1903 it created 4 new moshavot, Kfar Tavor, Yavniel, Melahamia (Menahamia), and Bait Vegan. In addition, it established an agricultural training farm at Sejera.

The Palestine operation was restructured by Baron de Rothschild in 1924 as the Palestine Jewish Colonization Association (PICA) and placed under the directorship of his son James Armand de Rothschild. PICA transferred most of its properties to the State of Israel in 1957 and 1958.
ICA resumed activities in Palestine in 1933, at first in association with another fund and from 1955 on by itself as "ICA in Israel".
ICA is at present supporting projects in the fields of education, agriculture and tourism in the north (Galilee) and south (Negev) regions of Israel.

Argentina
Focused on agricultural colonies in Argentina, until East European Jews were forbidden to, even if in 1896, when Hirsch died, the association owned a thousand square kilometers of land in the country, on which lived a thousand households, the “Jewish gauchos”. Theodor Herzl considered it expensive and unrealistic, against Zadoc Kahn who presented the German Jewish philanthropist Baron Maurice de Hirsch with the project of setting up a Jewish colony in Argentina, before the JCA was created in 1891. In 1920, 150,000 Jews lived in Argentina and new colonies appeared: (Lapin, Rivera), Entre Ríos (San Gregorio, Villa Domínguez, Carmel, Ingeniero Sajaroff, Villa Clara, and Villaguay), and Santa Fe (Moisés Ville) (about 64% Jews lived in Entre Ríos.)

United States
Colonies were founded within the United States in southern New Jersey, Ellington, Connecticut (Congregation Knesseth Israel), and elsewhere. A Canadian Committee of the JCA was established in November 1906 to assist in the settlement of thousands of Jewish refugees fleeing Russia, and to oversee the development of all JCA settlements in the country.

Turkey
The JCA also established two agricultural colonies in the first two decades of the 20th century in what now is Turkey. In 1891, JCA bought land near Karataş, Izmir, Turkey, and established an agricultural training centre, or Yehudah, on an area totaling 30 km² by 1902. The centre was closed in 1926 owing to numerous difficulties. A group of Romanian Jews in Anatolia were assisted by JCA in the early 20th century to establish an immigration bureau in Istanbul in 1910. The JCA also bought land in the Asian part of Istanbul and founded Mesillah Hadassah agricultural colony for several hundred families. In 1928 the colonies were mostly liquidated, with only the immigration bureau remaining to assist migrants in their migration to Palestine.

Canada
Economic factors, notably the Great Depression, led to the dissolution of all western Canadian colonies by the end of World War II. Thereafter concentrating its work in the east, the Canadian chapter of the JCA purchased farms and made loans to farmers in Ontario and Quebec. The JCA Canadian Committee made no loans after 1970 and ceased all legal existence in 1978. The JCA deposited the majority of its papers at the National Archives of the Canadian Jewish Congress in 1978, and the remainder (the "S" collection) there in 1989.

Directors-General

 Sigismond Sonnenfeld (1891–1911)
 Louis Oungre (1911–1949)
 Victor Girmounsky and Georges Aronstein (1949–1977)

See also
Kolonja Izaaka, Belarus
Moisés Ville, Argentina
Joseph Niego
Organization for Jewish Colonisation in the Soviet Union
Palestine Jewish Colonization Association

References

External links
 

Jewish refugee aid organizations
Jews and Judaism in Argentina
Jews and Judaism in Brazil
Jews and Judaism in Canada
Jews and Judaism in Turkey
Jews and Judaism in the United States
Romanian-Jewish diaspora
Russian-Jewish diaspora
Jewish settlement schemes
1891 establishments in France
Jewish charities
Jewish agricultural colonies